The Hungary national cricket team represents Hungary in international cricket. In June 2012, Hungary was awarded the International Cricket Council (ICC) affiliate member status in annual conference at Kuala Lumpur. In 2017, they became an associate member.

First friendly matches played in Slovenia in September 2007. First official match played in Prague against Bulgaria in August 2008.

In April 2018, the ICC decided to grant full Twenty20 International (T20I) status to all its members. Therefore, all Twenty20 matches played between Hungary and other ICC members after 1 January 2019 will be a full T20I.

In 2021 Hungary was among five teams excluded from the ICC T20I Championship for failing to play enough fixtures in the relevant period, an effect of the COVID-19 pandemic.

2010 European Twenty20 Championship
In 2010, the team won the European Twenty20 Championship which was held in Skopje, Macedonia, beating a strong Russian side in the final off the last ball.
Squad: Adrian Zádor *Andrew Leckonby Captain *Eddie Allnutt *Chris Priest *Habib Deldar *Haroon Abel *János Mátyásfalvi *Mike Glover *Ranjeet Kumar *Sufiyan Mohammed *Suman Manuel *Mátyás Balogh *Lucky Singh
Leading four bowlers were: Habib Deldar, Ranjit Kumar, Andrew Leckonby and Haroon Abel
Leading four batsmen were: Sufiyan Mohammed, Eddie Allnutt, Suman Manuel and Mike Glover
Wicketkeeper: Mike Glover
Best All-Rounder: Habib Deldar
Most outfield catches: Eddie Allnutt, Chris Priest, Ranjit Kumar and Habib Deldar
Official Scorer: Marianna Glover
Team Managers: Chris Priest and Andrew Leckonby
This team was drawn from all 6 leading sides in the Hungarian domestic cricket league http://www.hungary4cricket.com/

2011 European Twenty20 Championship
A year after the success detailed above, the team defended its crown in the same event, this time held on home soil at the new Sződliget GB Oval cricket ground. Having beaten Lithuania, Bulgaria and Macedonia in the group stages, Hungary then beat Croatia A in the semi-final before another convincing win against Bulgaria in the final, a match in which Haroon Abel starred with the ball and Eddie Allnutt with the bat. The leading Hungarian run-scorer over the seven days was Shiraz. Other successful newcomers to the side were native Hungarian all-rounder Tamas Torok and top-order batsman Marc Ahuja.

Also competing in the tournament were a Hungary A XI captained by Janos Matyasfalvi. Hungary A finished 6th out of the eight teams with Robin Sperling and Viktor Agoston being their best batsmen and Hungary Women's National player Brigi Hotea proving to be their most useful bowler.

2012 European Twenty20 Championship
From 9 to 15 September 2012, the Hungarian Men's National XI (defending champions) took on Serbia, Romania, A Welsh CB XI, Poland, Russia, Macedonia and Bulgaria in the popular annual Euro T20 tournament in Sofia, Bulgaria. The squad was very similar to the one which won on home soil in 2011, but was unable to win again.

Records
International Match Summary — Hungary
 
Last updated 3 July 2022.

Twenty20 International 
T20I record versus other nations

Records complete to T20I #1604. Last updated 3 July 2022.

See also
List of Hungary Twenty20 International cricketers

References

External links
Hungary Cricket site

National cricket teams
Cricket